Didwana (Assembly Constituency) is one of the constituencies of the Rajasthan Legislative Assembly in Nagaur (Lok Sabha constituency) And from here Chetan Singh Chaudhary is the MLA.

Elected members

References 

Assembly constituencies of Rajasthan
Nagaur district
Constituencies established in 1951